Sharpo (1977–1994) was the champion British  Thoroughbred sprinter of 1982. He won seven races and more than £230,000 in prize money during a career which was restricted by his marked preference for soft ground. He developed a particular liking for York Racecourse, winning the Nunthorpe Stakes - then known as the William Hill Sprint Championship - three times from 1980, becoming the first to do so since Tag End in the 1920s. He also won the July Cup at Newmarket Racecourse and the Prix de l'Abbaye de Longchamp, as well as twice being second in the major French sprint.

Sharpo went on to become a very successful sire before his death in June 1994, the winners of 216 races on the flat worth $1.7 million. He best winners were College Chapel, Risk Me, Cutting Blade and Lavinia Fontana.

References
 The Complete Encyclopedia of Horse Racing - written by Bill Mooney and George Ennor
 Sharpo's pedigree and racing stats

1977 racehorse births
1994 racehorse deaths
Racehorses trained in the United Kingdom
Racehorses bred in the United Kingdom
Thoroughbred family 9-e